Kilmegan is a civil parish in County Down, Northern Ireland. It is situated in the historic baronies of Iveagh Upper, Lower Half, Kinelarty and Lecale Upper.

Settlements
The civil parish contains the following settlements:
Castlewellan
Dundrum

Townlands
Kilmegan civil parish contains the following townlands:

Aughlisnafin
Ballybannan
Ballylough
Ballywillwill
Castlewellan
Clarkill
Cloghram
Clanvaraghan
Drumanaquoile
Dundrinne
Dundrum
Magherasaul
Moneycarragh
Moneylane
Murlough Lower
Slievenisky
Wateresk

See also
List of civil parishes of County Down

References